20 teams took part in the league with FC Dynamo Kyiv winning the championship.

League standings

Results

Top scorers
22 goals
 Berador Abduraimov (Pakhtakor)
 Georgi Gavasheli (Dinamo Tbilisi)

21 goals
 Eduard Streltsov (Torpedo Moscow)

14 goals
 Galimzyan Khusainov (Spartak Moscow)
 Vladimir Kozlov (Dynamo Moscow)

13 goals
 Oleg Kopayev (SKA Rostov-on-Don)

12 goals
 Mikhail Gershkovich (Torpedo Moscow)

11 goals
 Eduard Malofeyev (Dinamo Minsk)
 Anatoliy Puzach (Dynamo Kyiv)
 Demuri Vekua (Torpedo Kutaisi)

References

 Soviet Union - List of final tables (RSSSF)

Soviet Top League seasons
1
Soviet
Soviet